In mathematics, the Moore determinant is a determinant defined for Hermitian matrices over a quaternion algebra, introduced by .

See also

Dieudonné determinant

References

Matrices